Partha De (born 1940) is an Indian politician and a member of the Communist Party of India (Marxist). He has served as the School Education Minister and Health Minister in the Government of West Bengal.

Political career 
Partha De has represented Bankura Vidhan Sabha constituency as a Member of the Legislative Assembly of West Bengal for 5 terms, that is 25 years. He won in 1977, 1987, 1991, 1996 and 2006. He was a runner up in 1982 and 2001. In 2011, he decided to not contest in polls. He had served as the School Education Minister between 2006 and 2011 as a part of the Third Bhattacharjee ministry. He had also served as the health minister.

References 

1940 births
Living people
20th-century Bengalis
21st-century Bengalis
Communist Party of India (Marxist) politicians from West Bengal
Politicians from Kolkata